The 2016 Women's Four Nations Tournament (Torneio Quatro Nações) in Portuguese, was the 1st edition of the Women's Four Nations Tournament held in Belém, Brazil between 1–3 December as a Women's friendly handball tournament organised by the Brazilian Handball Confederation.

Results

Round robin
All times are local (UTC−03:00).

Final standing

Awards
 Best Player:  Martina Skolkova
Best Goalkeeper:  Bárbara Arenhart
Top Scorer:  Samira Rocha

References

External links
Tournament page on CBHb official web site

Women
Four Nations Tournament
2016 in Brazilian sport
Four
2016 in Brazilian women's sport